Taan may refer to:

 Taan (music), a virtuosic technique used in North Indian classical vocal music
 Taan (2014 film), a Bengali film
 The Taan, a fictional race in the Sovereign Stone trilogy
 Da'an District, a district in Taipei, Taiwan